Borja Ruiz (born 26 July 1992) is a Spanish volleyball player for CV Almería and the Spanish national team.

He participated at the 2017 Men's European Volleyball Championship.

References

1992 births
Living people
Spanish men's volleyball players